Alexander Schuck (born 18 May 1957) is an East German sprint canoer who competed in the 1980s. He won two medals in the C-2 1000 m event at the ICF Canoe Sprint World Championships with a gold in 1985 and a silver in 1983.

Schuck also finished fifth in the C-2 500 m event at the 1988 Summer Olympics in Seoul.

A native of Leipzig, he is married to swimmer Silke Hörner.

References

1957 births
Canoeists at the 1988 Summer Olympics
German male canoeists
Living people
Olympic canoeists of East Germany
Sportspeople from Leipzig
ICF Canoe Sprint World Championships medalists in Canadian